The Correspondence Chess Olympiad is a correspondence chess tournament in which teams from all over the world compete. International Correspondence Chess Federation organises the tournament.

Correspondence Chess Olympiads

Ladies Correspondence Chess Olympiads

See also 
 Chess Olympiad
 ICCF national member federations—Short articles about the federations
 ICCF numeric notation
 World Correspondence Chess Championship
 International Correspondence Chess Federation

References 

Chess Olympiads